Country Music Television (CMT) is an American pay TV network owned by Paramount Media Networks, a division of Paramount Global. Launched on March 5, 1983, as Country Music Television, CMT was the first nationally available channel devoted to country music and country music videos, with its programming also including concerts, specials, and biographies of country music stars. Over time, the network's programming expanded to incorporate original lifestyle/reality programming, and sitcoms geared toward blue collar audiences.

As of January 2018, approximately 92 million U.S. homes  (or 76.9% of the Nielsen-estimated 119.2 million television households ) receive CMT. The channel's headquarters are located in One Astor Plaza in New York City, and has additional offices in Nashville, Tennessee.

History

Early years (1983–1991) 

CMTV, an initialism for Country Music Television, was founded by Glenn D. Daniels, the owner of Video World Productions in Hendersonville, Tennessee. Daniels put together the ownership group of Telestar Corporation and the Blinder Robinson & Company investment bank in a three-way split. Daniels also served as the program director and the first president of the network. The network launched on March 5, 1983, at 6:19 p.m. CT, beating its chief competitor, The Nashville Network, to air by two days. The first video clip to air on CMT was Faron Young's 1971 hit "It's Four in the Morning". The following summer, MTV (acquired by Viacom 16 years later) filed a trademark infringement lawsuit over the initials CMTV, and the network changed its name to simply CMT.

In 1991, Opryland USA and its owner Gaylord Entertainment Company acquired CMT in a $34 million deal. The network was sold by a group led by radio station owner Robert Sillerman, record producer James Guercio and Nyhl L Henson. Opryland USA and owner Gaylord also owned CMT's competitor The Nashville Network. In October 1992, CMT launched its first international channel, CMT Europe, as part of the Sky Multichannels package. In July 1995, CMT launched its Brazilian version in association with Grupo Abril's TVA. By 1998, Gaylord reported $10 million in losses from CMT Europe and decided to cease broadcasting the network on March 31, 1998. Gaylord had planned to emulate the successful model created by E!, by selling large programming blocks to other European channels, but these plans never occurred.

On October 1, 1994, CMT made its first major format change by adding several new music-oriented programs. In 1995, CMT dropped all videos by Canadian artists without U.S. record contracts in response to the network being replaced in Canada by Calgary, Alberta-based New Country Network. By March 1996, CMT had eventually returned the dropped videos to its playlist after reaching an agreement to acquire a 20% ownership of New Country Network, relaunching it as a domestic version of CMT.

Under CBS/Viacom (1997–2017) 

In 1997, both CMT and TNN were sold to Westinghouse, then-owner of CBS, for a reported $1.5 billion. CBS would in-turn be acquired by Viacom in 1999, assuming ownership of CMT and TNN and folding them into the MTV Networks. TNN would phase out country programming to avoid overlap with CMT, changing its name to "The National Network", and later relaunching altogether as Spike in 2003. Spike eventually rebranded as Paramount Network in 2018.

Despite the decrease in music programming, CMT experienced significant ratings gains since its acquisition. By 2007, the channel was available in more than 83 million homes. On April 4, 2012, CMT announced its first adult animated series, Bounty Hunters, and  Trinity 911, a 10-episode "workplace docu-comedy". Trinity 911 was later renamed Big Texas Heat and was removed from the schedule after airing four episodes.

On June 10, 2016, CMT announced that they would pick up the ABC series Nashville following its original cancellation of the series. The network would order a fifth season of 22 episodes.

Restructuring (2017–present) 
In 2017, as part of Viacom's restructuring plans, CMT would begin a transition back to unscripted programming. As a result, Nashvilles sixth season would also be its last.

As part of its shift back to unscripted programming, CMT announced Music City in September 2017, a reality series created by Adam DiVello of  The Hills and Laguna Beach fame. Set in Nashville, the show features Bryant Lowry, a drummer in the Nashville pop band Jet Black Alley Cat. The series premiered on March 1, 2018.

In 2019, Viacom acquired Pluto TV, and launched several CMT-branded channels, including a channel focused on Western genre movies (CMT Westerns) and a channel dedicated to Dallas Cowboys Cheerleaders: Making the Team.

In October 2021, CMT picked up the second season of The Last Cowboy—a reality series by Yellowstone co-creator Taylor Sheridan. The program had moved from Paramount Network as part of an aborted relaunch of the network as a movie channel.

 Programming 

CMT's current programming consists largely of acquired sitcoms and movies. The channel's daily country music programming consists of a five-hour music video block, seen during the early morning hours, as well as CMT Hot Twenty, which airs on weekend mornings. Of Viacom's former music channels (not counting its suite of all-music digital channels), CMT has historically been the most devoted to music-related programming and previously set aside at least six hours of its daily schedule for music videos during the overnight and morning hours. In addition, most of CMT's original programming is centered or related to the Culture of Dallas or Nashville, Tennessee, where the network's studios are located.

CMT's music mix is primarily focused on mainstream hit country songs, but also includes occasional videos from crossover, Americana, and alternative acts (dubbed "CMT Edge"). Specials seen on the network include the annual CMT Music Awards (since 2022, in a simulcast with CBS), featuring awards in various categories and performances by country music artists, and CMT Crossroads, which pairs country music artists with musicians from other music genres. It also carries simulcasts of MTV and Nickelodeon's own award specials as part of Paramount's common "road block" event programming strategy.

 CMT Music CMT Music (formerly CMT Pure Country) is an American pay television channel and a sister network to CMT. It exclusively carries country music videos in an 8-hour programming wheel schedule similar to several other video-exclusive networks owned by Paramount Global.

 History 

The network was first launched as VH1 Country, a country music video-oriented spinoff of VH1. The channel launched on August 1, 1998, predating the merger of CBS Cable networks TNN and CMT into Viacom. On May 27, 2006, the channel rebranded as CMT Pure Country to realign the CMT brand to solely represent Viacom's country music-related programming.

On January 4, 2016, the network's name was changed to CMT Music. Outside of the addition of full-length video tags throughout videos and new imaging, no major changes came to the channel's programming. In 2015, the network discontinued specific video blocks due to that year's cutbacks throughout Viacom, including music video programmers.

The network has lost carriage throughout time with the growth of streaming video options, being carried solely in standard definition, and CMT no longer being considered a prime network among those in Paramount Global's suite. CMT Music  has generally been depreciated by Paramount Global in current retransmission consent negotiations with cable and streaming providers for other options such as its Pluto TV streaming service, which provides several CMT and Vevo-branded country music channels. in 2021, Spectrum removed it from their current-day packages, with only grandfathered subscribers with older packages able to view the network.

 Programming 
Currently, the network offers an eight-hour wheel of videos, all under the EPG-only title of CMT Music with little theming of video blocks outside promoting special events such as the CMT Music Awards nominees and winners around the ceremony. As Pure Country, the network featured branded blocks of programming sub-divided by genres and periods of time.

 Pure Vintage featured a mix of classic and vintage country music videos that were filmed and aired prior to 2000, including older performance video clips of songs. The block aired for 30 minutes, twice a day.
 The Edge Bluegrass, neo-traditionalist country, and Americana music videos are featured. Originally branded as Wide Open Country Studio 330 Sessions Live sessions recorded at CMT's studios in Nashville (330 refers to CMT's Nashville address of 330 Commerce Street). Segments from the sessions continue to air in the channel's current rotation.
 Pure 12 Pack Countdown' As with all of MTV's countdown shows, a limited pool of videos was voted on by fans online and sorted by popularity without industry or recording metrics.

International and related networks 
 CMT Europe - Launched in October 1992 and closed in March 1998.
 CMT Brazil - Launched in July 1995 and closed in March 2001. Replaced by MusicCountry.
 CMT Australia - Launched on July 1, 2020, as a replacement for Country Music Channel. Dedicated to country music videos. 
 CMT Music - Dedicated to country music videos. Launched on August 1, 1998, as "VH1 Country" and rebranded as "CMT Pure Country" from May 27, 2006, to January 4, 2016.
 CMT (Canada) - Canadian version majority-owned by Corus Entertainment with Viacom owning a 10% stake in the channel. Unlike its American counterpart, CMT Canada shifted its focus toward family-oriented programming. The network has only sparingly acquired shows and specials sourced from the U.S. version in-favor of producing its own original programming. The channel previously aired country music programming during the daytime hours and general entertainment programming in the evenings; it would abandon the former format altogether in August 2017. It was originally launched as the "New Country Network" on January 1, 1995.
 The Nashville Network - A former rival network. It became a sibling to CMT in 1997 and eventually shifted to a general entertainment format to prevent overlap. Its original incarnation was relaunched as Spike TV in 2003 and, later, Paramount Network in 2018.

References

External links 
 
 CMT Founder's Site

American country music
English-language television stations in the United States
Ryman Hospitality Properties
Paramount Media Networks
Music video networks in the United States
Television channels and stations established in 1983
Companies based in New York City
Mass media in Nashville, Tennessee
Television networks in the United States
Country music mass media